Janine Kohlmann (born November 28, 1990) is a German modern pentathlete. She got the gold medal in the relay event at the 2012 World Championships.

References

External links

Information on scoring

1990 births
Living people
German female modern pentathletes
World Modern Pentathlon Championships medalists
Sportspeople from Düsseldorf
21st-century German women